Space Quest III: The Pirates of Pestulon is a 1989 graphic adventure game by Sierra On-Line, and the third game in the Space Quest series.

Plot 

Roger Wilco's escape pod from the end of Space Quest II is floating in space until it is picked up by an automated garbage freighter. Finding a derelict spaceship amongst the freighter's garbage, Roger sets out to repair the Aluminum Mallard and leave the scow.

Roger visits a variety of locations, including a fast food restaurant called Monolith Burger and a desert planet called Phleebhut. At the latter, he encounters trouble, as Arnoid the Annihilator (an Arnold Schwarzenegger-like android terminator) persecutes him for not paying for a whistle acquired in Space Quest II. From information he picks up there and at Monolith Burger, Roger eventually uncovers the sinister activities of a video game company known as ScumSoft, run by the "Pirates of Pestulon".

Pestulon, a small moon of the volcanic planet Ortega, is covered in soft, moss-like vegetation, and dotted with twisted tree-like growths throughout. Elmo Pug, the CEO of ScumSoft, has abducted the Two Guys from Andromeda and is forcing them to design awful games.

Roger manages to sneak into the entrance of the supposedly impregnable ScumSoft building (an homage to the secret entrance of the shield generator from Return of the Jedi) and rescue the two programmers. He is discovered, and must battle Pug in a game that combines giant Mecha-style combat with Rock 'Em Sock 'Em Robots. After winning, Roger and the Two Guys escape. After fighting off several ScumSoft space ships, the trio realize that the warp drive is broken. After tinkering with it and no warp course set in, the trio are warped into a parallel dimension. In the game's conclusion, Roger delivers the two game designers to Sierra On-Line's president, Ken Williams, on Earth, before Roger departs the planet after being turned down for a janitorial job.

Gameplay 
PC versions of the game support mouse movement and a new, heavily improved text parser. Mouse movement was still in a primitive state at the time of the game's release, so Roger is unable to automatically find his way around obstacles in the game world, instead stopping if he encounters a barrier. Computer mice were relatively new at the time, and Sierra's mouse movement would greatly improve in subsequent games.

Astro Chicken 
Astro Chicken is an arcade minigame in Space Quest III. Gameplay consists of attempting to land a chicken on a trampoline. The mechanics of the game are similar to those of Lunar Lander, with the exception that the chicken rebounds unharmed if it strikes the trampoline too forcefully. Achieving a high score reveals a hidden distress message left by the Two Guys from Andromeda. The Astro Chicken theme music is a variation on Chicken Reel, a traditional folk song best known for its use in animated cartoons. Sierra released the Astro Chicken minigame as a demo to promote Space Quest III.

Development 
Space Quest III was developed using an early version of Sierra's SCI engine. Unlike the series' previous installments, the player is no longer able to choose the protagonist's name. From this game onward, the character is known as Roger Wilco, the name that had previously been the default.

It features music composed by Supertramp drummer Bob Siebenberg, and was one of the first games to support the new Sound Blaster sound card. Sound effects include digitized audio sampling, such as the voice of Roger saying "Where am I?" during the introduction. The digitized effects can be heard in the Tandy, Amiga and Macintosh versions of the game. Though Space Quest III was designed to utilize the Sound Blaster's ability to play digital samples, the inclusion of an incorrect audio driver left the effects unavailable to IBM PC users with the Sound Blaster card.

Space Quest III was released on March 24, 1989.

It is the only game in the series to not have originated or have been remade (officially or unofficially) beyond the EGA graphics engine. Several attempts got cancelled. On 2003, a non playing demo was released.

Reception 
In the September 1989 edition of C&VG (Issue 94), the reviewer gave the Atari ST version of Space Quest III a score of 83%, calling it "enjoyable and addictive". In 1989, Dragon gave the game 4 out of 5 stars. The Macintosh & PC/MS-DOS versions of the game were also given 4 out of 5 stars. Compute! praised the game's graphics and sound card audio, stating that they were the best of the series. STart also praised the ST version's graphics and sound. While warning that Space Quest III was "essentially a text adventure" with syntax guessing and frequent saved game reloading, the magazine described it as "not-too-difficult" and suitable for those new to adventure games. Computer Gaming World gave the game a positive review, noting improvements in the presentation and action sequences over its predecessors. In 1989 the magazine gave it a Special Award for Achievement in Sound, and in 1996 listed the player's body parts being sold at a butcher shop as #2 on its list of "the 15 best ways to die in computer gaming".

The editors of Game Player's PC Strategy Guide gave Space Quest III their 1989 "Best PC Adventure Role-Playing Game" and "Best PC EGA Graphics" awards.

In the May 1990 edition of Games International, John Scott called this program "Brilliant! The graphics are super." He also thought the musical soundtrack was "the best I have yet encountered in any computer game." He noted the streak of humour running through the game, saying, "sometimes it's warped, sometimes cruel, but it's always funny." He did criticize the long loading times for each screen, and the computer's habit of prompting a disk change before the save sequence was finished. Nevertheless he gave both the gameplay and graphics an excellent rating of 9, saying, "I think you'll like this. I did. A lot."

According to Sierra On-Line, combined sales of the Space Quest series surpassed 1.2 million units by the end of March 1996.

References

External links 
 
 

1989 video games
Adventure games
Point-and-click adventure games
Amiga games
Atari ST games
DOS games
1980s interactive fiction
ScummVM-supported games
Sierra Entertainment games
Space Quest
Video game sequels
Games commercially released with DOSBox
Video games developed in the United States